Paulo Reglus Neves Freire (19 September 1921 – 2 May 1997) was a Brazilian educator and philosopher who was a leading advocate of critical pedagogy. His influential work Pedagogy of the Oppressed is generally considered one of the foundational texts of the critical pedagogy movement, and was the third most cited book in the social sciences  according to Google Scholar.

Biography

Freire was born on 19 September 1921 to a middle-class family in Recife, the capital of the northeastern Brazilian state of Pernambuco. He became familiar with poverty and hunger from an early age as a result of the Great Depression. In 1931 his family moved to the more affordable city of Jaboatão dos Guararapes, 18 km west of Recife. His father died on 31 October 1934.

During his childhood and adolescence, Freire ended up four grades behind, and his social life revolved around playing pick-up football with other poor children, from whom he claims to have learned a great deal. These experiences would shape his concerns for the poor and would help to construct his particular educational viewpoint. Freire stated that poverty and hunger severely affected his ability to learn. These experiences influenced his decision to dedicate his life to improving the lives of the poor: "I didn't understand anything because of my hunger. I wasn't dumb. It wasn't lack of interest.  My social condition didn't allow me to have an education. Experience showed me once again the relationship between social class and knowledge". Eventually, his family's misfortunes turned around and their prospects improved.

Freire enrolled in law school at the University of Recife in 1943. He also studied philosophy, more specifically phenomenology, and the psychology of language. Although admitted to the legal bar, he never practiced law and instead worked as a secondary school Portuguese teacher. In 1944, he married Elza Maia Costa de Oliveira, a fellow teacher. The two worked together and had five children.

In 1946, Freire was appointed director of the Pernambuco Department of Education and Culture. Working primarily among the illiterate poor, Freire began to develop an educational praxis that would have an influence on the liberation theology movement of the 1970s. In 1940s Brazil, literacy was a requirement for voting in presidential elections.

In 1961, he was appointed director of the Department of Cultural Extension at the University of Recife. In 1962, he had the first opportunity for large-scale application of his theories, when, in an experiment, 300 sugarcane harvesters were taught to read and write in just 45 days.  In response to this experiment, the Brazilian government approved the creation of thousands of cultural circles across the country.

The 1964 Brazilian coup d'état put an end to Freire's literacy effort, as the ruling military junta did not endorse it. Freire was subsequently imprisoned as a traitor for 70 days. After a brief exile in Bolivia, Freire worked in Chile for five years for the Christian Democratic Agrarian Reform Movement and the United Nations Food and Agriculture Organization.  In 1967, Freire published his first book, Education as the Practice of Freedom. He followed it up with his most famous work, Pedagogy of the Oppressed, which was first published in 1968.

After a positive international reception of his work, Freire was offered a visiting professorship at Harvard University in 1969. The next year, Pedagogy of the Oppressed was published in Spanish and English, vastly expanding its reach. Because of political feuds between Freire, a Christian socialist, and Brazil's successive right-wing authoritarian military governments, the book went unpublished in Brazil until 1974, when, starting with the presidency of Ernesto Geisel, the military junta started a process of slow and controlled political liberalisation.

Following a year in Cambridge, Massachusetts, Freire moved to Geneva to work as a special education advisor to the World Council of Churches. During this time Freire acted as an advisor on education reform in several former Portuguese colonies in Africa, particularly Guinea-Bissau and Mozambique.

In 1979, he first visited Brazil after more than a decade of exile, eventually moving back in 1980. Freire joined the Workers' Party (PT) in São Paulo and acted as a supervisor for its adult literacy project from 1980 to 1986. When the Workers' Party won the 1988 São Paulo mayoral elections in 1988, Freire was appointed municipal Secretary of Education.

Freire died of heart failure on 2 May 1997, in São Paulo.

Pedagogy

Paulo Freire contributed a philosophy of education which blended classical approaches stemming from Plato and modern Marxist, post-Marxist, and anti-colonialist thinkers. His Pedagogy of the Oppressed (1968) can be read as an extension of, or reply to, Frantz Fanon's The Wretched of the Earth (1961), which emphasized the need to provide native populations with an education which was simultaneously new and modern, rather than traditional, and anti-colonial – not simply an extension of the colonizing culture.

In Pedagogy of the Oppressed, Freire, reprising the oppressors–oppressed distinction, applies the distinction to education, championing that education should allow the oppressed to regain their sense of humanity, in turn overcoming their condition. Nevertheless, he acknowledges that for this to occur, the oppressed individual must play a role in their liberation.

No pedagogy which is truly liberating can remain distant from the oppressed by treating them as unfortunates and by presenting for their emulation models from among the oppressors. The oppressed must be their own example in the struggle for their redemption.

Likewise, oppressors must be willing to rethink their way of life and to examine their own role in oppression if true liberation is to occur: "Those who authentically commit themselves to the people must re-examine themselves constantly".

Freire believed education could not be divorced from politics; the act of teaching and learning are considered political acts in and of themselves. Freire defined this connection as a main tenet of critical pedagogy. Teachers and students must be made aware of the politics that surround education. The way students are taught and what they are taught serves a political agenda. Teachers, themselves, have political notions they bring into the classroom. Freire believed that

Criticism of the "banking model" of education

In terms of pedagogy, Freire is best known for his attack on what he called the "banking" concept of education, in which students are viewed as empty accounts to be filled by teachers. He notes that "it transforms students into receiving objects [and] attempts to control thinking and action, lead[ing] men and women to adjust to the world, inhibit[ing] their creative power." The basic critique was not entirely novel, and paralleled Jean-Jacques Rousseau's conception of children as active learners, as opposed to a tabula rasa view, more akin to the banking model. John Dewey was also strongly critical of the transmission of mere facts as the goal of education. Dewey often described education as a mechanism for social change, stating that "education is a regulation of the process of coming to share in the social consciousness; and that the adjustment of individual activity on the basis of this social consciousness is the only sure method of social reconstruction". Freire's work revived this view and placed it in context with contemporary theories and practices of education, laying the foundation for what would later be termed critical pedagogy.

Culture of silence
According to Freire, unequal social relations create a "culture of silence" that instills the oppressed with a negative, passive and suppressed self-image; learners must, then, develop a critical consciousness in order to recognize that this culture of silence is created to oppress. A culture of silence can also cause the "dominated individuals [to] lose the means by which to critically respond to the culture that is forced on them by a dominant culture."

He considers social, race and class dynamics to be interlaced into the conventional education system, through which this culture of silence eliminates the "paths of thought that lead to a language of critique."

Legacy and reception
Since the publication of the English-language edition in 1970, Pedagogy of the Oppressed has had a large impact in education and pedagogy worldwide, especially as a defining work of critical pedagogy. According to Israeli writer and education reform theorist Sol Stern, it has "achieved near-iconic status in America's teacher-training programs". Connections have also been made between Freire's non-dualism theory in pedagogy and Eastern philosophical traditions such as the Advaita Vedanta.

In 1977, the Adult Learning Project, based on Freire's work, was established in the Gorgie-Dalry neighborhood of Edinburgh, Scotland. This project had the participation of approximately 200 people in the first years, and had among its aims to provide affordable and relevant local learning opportunities and to build a network of local tutors. In Scotland, Freire's ideas of popular education influenced activist movements not only in Edinburgh but also in Glasgow.

Freire's major exponents in North America are Henry Giroux, Peter McLaren, Donaldo Macedo, Antonia Darder, Joe L. Kincheloe, Shirley R. Steinberg, Carlos Alberto Torres, and Ira Shor. One of McLaren's edited texts, Paulo Freire: A Critical Encounter, expounds upon Freire's impact in the field of critical pedagogy. McLaren has also provided a comparative study concerning Paulo Freire and Argentinian revolutionary icon Che Guevara. Freire's work influenced the radical math movement in the United States, which emphasizes social justice issues and critical pedagogy as components of mathematical curricula.

In South Africa, Freire's ideas and methods were central to the 1970s Black Consciousness Movement, often associated with Steve Biko, as well as the trade union movement in the 1970s and 1980s, and the United Democratic Front in the 1980s. There is a Paulo Freire Project at the University of KwaZulu-Natal in Pietermaritzburg.

In 1991, the Paulo Freire Institute was established in São Paulo to extend and elaborate upon his theories of popular education. The institute has started projects in many countries and is headquartered at the UCLA Graduate School of Education and Information Studies, where it actively maintains the Freire archives. Its director is UCLA professor Carlos Torres, the author of several Freirean works, including the 1978 A praxis educativa de Paulo Freire.

In 1999 PAULO, a national training organisation named in honour of Freire, was established in the United Kingdom. This agency was approved by the New Labour Government to represent some 300,000 community-based education practitioners working across the UK. PAULO was given formal responsibility for setting the occupational training standards for people working in this field.

The Paulo and Nita Freire Project for International Critical Pedagogy was founded at McGill University. Here Joe L. Kincheloe and Shirley R. Steinberg worked to create a dialogical forum for critical scholars around the world to promote research and re-create a Freirean pedagogy in a multinational domain. After the death of Kincheloe, the project was transformed into a virtual global resource.

In 2012, a group of educators in Western Massachusetts, United States, received permission to name a public school after Freire. The Holyoke, Massachusetts, Paulo Freire Social Justice Charter School opened in September 2013. The school moved to the former Pope Francis Catholic High School building in Chicopee, Massachusetts, in 2019.

In 2012, Paolo Freire Charter High School opened in Newark, New Jersey. The state closed the school in 2017 due to lagging test scores and lack of "instructional rigor."

Shortly before his death, Freire was working on a book of ecopedagogy, a platform of work carried on by many of the Freire Institutes and Freirean Associations around the world today. It has been influential in helping to develop planetary education projects such as the Earth Charter as well as countless international grassroots campaigns in the spirit of Freirean popular education generally.

Freirean literacy methods have been adopted throughout the developing world. In the Philippines, Catholic "basal Christian communities" adopted Freire's methods in community education. Papua New Guinea, Freirean literacy methods were used as part of the World Bank-funded Southern Highlands Rural Development Program's Literacy Campaign. Freirean approaches also lie at the heart of the "Dragon Dreaming" approach to community programs that have spread to 20 countries by 2014.

Awards and honors

 King Baudouin International Development Prize 1980: Paulo Freire was the first person to receive this prize. He was nominated by Mathew Zachariah, Professor of Education at the University of Calgary.
 Prize for Outstanding Christian Educators, with his wife Elza
 UNESCO Prize for Peace Education 1986
 Honorary Doctorate, the University of Nebraska at Omaha, 1996, along with Augusto Boal, during their residency at the Second Pedagogy and Theatre of the Oppressed Conference in Omaha.
 Honorary Degree from Claremont Graduate University, 1992
 Honorary Doctorate from The Open University, 1973
 Inducted, International Adult and Continuing Education Hall of Fame, 2008
Honorary Degree from the University of Illinois at Chicago, 1993.

Bibliography
Freire wrote and co-wrote over 20 books on education, pedagogy and related themes.

Some of his works include:
 Freire, P. (1970). Pedagogy of the Oppressed.  New York, Continuum.
 Freire, P. (1970). Cultural Action for Freedom. [Cambridge], Harvard Educational Review.
 Freire, P. (1973). Education for Critical Consciousness. New York, Seabury Press.
 Freire, P. (1975). Conscientization. Geneva, World Council of Churches.
 Freire, P. (1976). Education, the Practice of Freedom. London, Writers and Readers Publishing Cooperative.
 Freire, P. (1978). Pedagogy in Process: The Letters to Guinea-Bissau. New York, A Continuum Book: The Seabury Press.
 Freire, P. (1985). The Politics of Education: Culture, Power, and Liberation. South Hadley,  MA, Bergin & Garvey.
 Freire, P. & D.P. Macedo (1987). Literacy: Reading the Word & the World. South Hadley, MA, Bergin & Garvey Publishers.
 Freire, P. & I. Shor (1987). Freire for the Classroom: A Sourcebook for Liberators Teaching.
 Freire, P. and H. Giroux & P. McLaren (1988). Teachers as Intellectuals: Towards a Critical Pedagogy of Learning.
 Freire, P. & I. Shor (1988). Cultural Wars: School and Society in the Conservative Restoration, 1969–1984.
 Freire, P. (1993). Pedagogy of the City. New York, Continuum.
 Faundez, Antonion, and Paulo Freire (1992). Learning to Question: A Pedagogy of Liberation. Trans. Tony Coates, New York, Continuum.
 Freire, P. and A.M.A. Freire (1994). Pedagogy of Hope: Reliving Pedagogy of the Oppressed. New York, Continuum.
 Freire, P. (1997). Mentoring the Mentor: A Critical Dialogue with Paulo Freire. New York, P. Lang.
 Freire, P. & A.M.A. Freire (1997). Pedagogy of the Heart. New York, Continuum.
 Freire, P. (1998). Pedagogy of Freedom: Ethics, Democracy and Civic Courage. Lanham, Rowman & Littlefield Publishers.
 Freire, P. (1998). Politics and Education. Los Angeles, UCLA Latin American Center Publications.
 Freire, P. (1998). Teachers as Cultural Workers: Letters to Those Who Dare Teach. Boulder,  CO, Westview Press.

See also

 Adult education
 Michael Apple
 John Asimakopoulos
 Clodomir Santos de Morais
 Dialogic education
 Dialogic learning
 Dialogic pedagogy
 Raya Dunayevskaya
 Education in Brazil
 Lewis Gordon
 James D. Kirylo
 Landless Workers' Movement
 Marxist humanism
 Paulo Freire University
 Peer mentoring
 Popular education
 Praxis intervention
 Problem-posing education
 Rouge Forum
 Second Episcopal Conference of Latin America
 Structure and agency

Notes

References

Footnotes

Works cited

Further reading

 
 
 
 
 
 
 
 
 
 
 
 
 Mann, Bernhard, The Pedagogical and Political Concepts of Mahatma Gandhi and Paulo Freire. In: Claußen, B. (Ed.) International Studies in Political Socialization and ion. Bd. 8. Hamburg 1996.

External links 

 International Journal for Transformative Research
 Digital Library Paulo Freire (Pt-Br)
 Pedagogy of the Oppressed by Paulo Freire
 PopEd Toolkit - Exercises/Links inspired by Freire's work
 Interview with Maria Araújo Freire on her marriage to Paulo Freire
 A dialogue with Paulo Freire and Ira Shor (1988)

1921 births
1997 deaths
20th-century  Brazilian economists
Brazilian Christian socialists
Brazilian educational theorists
Brazilian educators
Brazilian exiles
Brazilian prisoners and detainees
Catholic socialists
Christian communists
Christian humanists
Critical pedagogy
Critical theorists
Development specialists
Education writers
Marxist humanists
People from Campinas
People from Recife
Philosophers of education
Postcolonial theorists
Popular education
Prisoners and detainees of Brazil
Catholic philosophers
Liberation theologians
Libertarian Marxists
Academic staff of the State University of Campinas
Academic staff of the University of Geneva
Academic staff of the University of Oldenburg
Workers' Party (Brazil) politicians
Youth empowerment people
20th-century Brazilian philosophers